Broken Toys is an 8-minute 1935 animation by Disney in the Silly Symphonies series. The toys in the story include caricatures of W.C. Fields, Zasu Pitts, Ned Sparks and Stepin Fetchit. Broken Toys was originally scheduled to follow Elmer Elephant and Three Little Wolves but was moved ahead of these titles in order to have it ready for a Christmas release.

Plot
In the pile of overused and broken toys, a discarded sailor doll gives the other toys, including an Aunt Jemima and Stepin Fetchit doll, a plan on how they can be repaired and bring happiness to others during Christmas.

Voice cast
 Boy doll: Tommy Bupp
 Girl doll: Leone LeDoux
 W.C. Fields: Scott Whitaker
 ZaSu Pitts, Mae West: Martha Wentworth
 Cop: Bud Duncan
 Misc. voices: The Rhythmettes, Leo Cleary, Frank Nelson, Ted Osborne, Cliff Clark, Shirley Reed, Mandy Peters

Home media
The short was released on December 19, 2006, on Walt Disney Treasures: More Silly Symphonies, Volume Two in the "From the Vault" section.

See also 
 List of Christmas films

References

External links
 

1935 films
1935 short films
1935 animated films
1930s Disney animated short films
Films produced by Walt Disney
Silly Symphonies
Films directed by Ben Sharpsteen
1930s Christmas films
Films about sentient toys
Cultural depictions of W. C. Fields
Cultural depictions of Mae West
1930s American films